USS Port Fire was a steamer commissioned by the Union Navy during the American Civil War.

She served the navy fleet during the blockade of ports and waterways of the Confederate States of America as an ammunition ship.

Service history 

Port Fire, a screw tug, built at the Portsmouth Navy Yard, Kittery, Maine, in 1863, was launched 8 March 1864. She served through the Civil War as a powder tug. Port Fire was sold in January 1878. She was later broken up at Portsmouth, New Hampshire.

References 

Ships of the Union Navy
Ships built in Kittery, Maine
Steamships of the United States Navy
Tugs of the United States Navy
Ammunition ships of the United States Navy
American Civil War auxiliary ships of the United States
1864 ships